Songs That Jesus Said is the first studio album featuring songs by Keith Getty and Kristyn Getty intended specifically for children. A published score and CD tracks were released in conjunction with this CD. All songs on the album were written jointly by Keith Getty and Kristyn Getty, and most are based on specific passages of the Christian Bible, especially the four Gospels.

Track listing
Better Is One Day with Jesus(Luke 10)
He Is My Light(John 8:12)
Underneath the Shining Star(Matthew 1-2)
Have You Seen Him?(Luke 9:18-20)
Two Little Houses(Matthew 7:24-27)
Stop and Think(Matthew 20:26-27)
Seed You Sow(Luke 8)
Store Up Good(Luke 6:45)
Little Zac(Luke 19:1-10)
Look to Jesus(John 4, John 7)
Once Upon a Boat(Matthew 8:23-27)
Let the Little Children Come(Matthew 19:13-15)
Father in Heaven(Matthew 6:9-13)
You Know(Matthew 10:29-31)
Remember(Matthew 6:25-31)
You Are the Shepherd(John 10:3-5)
In My Father's House(John 14:1-4)
The Grace Song of Heaven
Christ Has Risen
I'm Ready to Go(Matthew 28:18-20)

Credits 

Joni McCabe – Producer
Tim Oliver – Arranger
Katrina McClay & Susie Young – Conductors
Mudd Wallace - Engineer (Homestead Recording Studios, Northern Ireland)
Dave Schober - Mastering
Eric Wyse - ‘Final Touches’
Leigh Merchant - Album Art
(c) 2005 Getty Music

External links
Getty Music
“Songs That Jesus Said: Singing the Bible for Young Worshipers,” audio lecture by Keith & Kristyn Getty, delivered at The Southern Baptist Theological Seminary on October 6, 2005 (mp3).
Review in Reformed Worship, issue no. 81 (September 2006), by Carl Stam and Fritz West.

2005 albums
Keith & Kristyn Getty albums
Children's music albums by artists from Northern Ireland